Leopardstown Valley is a stop on the Luas light-rail tram system in Dún Laoghaire - Rathdown, south of Dublin, Ireland. It opened in 2010 as a stop on the extension of the Green Line south from Sandyford to Brides Glen. The stop provides access to the nearby residential area of Leopardstown and its eponymous shopping centre.

Service
The stop is located at the side of Ballyogan Road, in the middle of a 2 km stretch of reserved track which runs alongside the road.

References

Luas Green Line stops in Dún Laoghaire–Rathdown
Railway stations opened in 2010
2010 establishments in Ireland
Railway stations in the Republic of Ireland opened in the 21st century